Father Time is a fictional character, a supervillain in publications from DC Comics. The character first appeared in Seven Soldiers: Frankenstein #3 (April 2006), and was created by Grant Morrison and Doug Mahnke.

Fictional character biography
Father Time is the commander of the Super Human Advanced Defense Executive (S.H.A.D.E.), a Patriot Act-funded covert operations group employing metahumans to fight terrorism. His own concerns appear to have at least as much to do with consolidating power as with national security. In Uncle Sam and the Freedom Fighters #1, he assassinates a presidential candidate applying too much scrutiny on S.H.A.D.E., and replaces him with a double, Gonzo the Mechanical Bastard.

Father Time first appeared in Grant Morrison's Seven Soldiers of Victory: Frankenstein #3, temporarily pressing the undead assassin into S.H.A.D.E. service. During the event known as World War III, Time and S.H.A.D.E. try to stop the rampaging Black Adam, and Adam rips off Time's face.

Time, confined to a hospital bed, then metamorphoses into a new form. He next appeared in the Infinite Crisis tie-in The Battle for Blüdhaven, and appears to be a major player in the new Freedom Fighters miniseries.

Father Time is reborn in a new body on New Year's Day to accompany the new year. In Frankenstein, he appears as a young black man wearing a costume resembling The Spirit's, but wearing a bowler hat. This is his appearance when Black Adam rips his face off. The Father Time shown in Freedom Fighters, on the other hand, is an elderly white man with long hair and a Buffalo Bill beard, except for the seventh and eighth issues, in which he resembles an African-American Doctor Occult. In September 2011, The New 52 rebooted DC's continuity and Father Time still exists in this new timeline, first seen with the appearance of an elementary-age Japanese girl, complete with school uniform, wearing a domino mask as seen in The New 52: Futures End.

For most of the new Uncle Sam and The Freedom Fighters series, Father Time was depicted as a villain, but in issue eight he reveals that he knew the danger Gonzo posed all along, and created the new versions of Doll Man, Phantom Lady, etc., to bring Uncle Sam forth, make his new team heroes in the public eye, and defeat Gonzo's plan. When Gonzo is defeated, Time takes himself and his S.H.A.D.E. soldiers into the timestream.

Powers and abilities
Father Time possesses enhanced strength, enough to engage the Atomic Knights in battle. At the beginning of each year, he regenerates and takes on a new appearance. In The New 52, Father Time has stated that he generates a new appearance every decade rather than every year.

Other versions
 There was a different kind of Father Time who had fought Hawkman. This version is a brash young scientist who traveled across the world, obtaining various plants reputed to enhance mental capacity, and developed a brew that gave him the wisdom of the ages while aging his body rapidly to old age. He wielded a scythe that shot a dart, made from a metal that dissolves once in the heat of the body, delivering a poison not known to modern science.

References

DC Comics characters with superhuman strength
DC Comics military personnel
DC Comics supervillains
Comics characters introduced in 2006
Characters created by Doug Mahnke
Characters created by Grant Morrison
Fictional characters with immortality
DC Comics metahumans